Cycas litoralis is a species of cycad in Southeast Asia.

References

litoralis